East Station may refer to:

Denmark
 Aarhus East station
 Copenhagen East station

France
 Gare de l'Est (Paris East)

Germany
 Berlin Ostbahnhof (Berlin East)
 Frankfurt East station
 Hildesheim Ost railway station
 München Ost station (Munich East)
 Offenbach Ost station
 Ratingen Ost station
 Saarbrücken-Ost station
 Wiesbaden Ost station (Wiesbaden East)

Hungary
 Budapest Keleti railway station (Budapest Eastern)

People's Republic of China
 Beijing East railway station
 Chengdu East railway station
 Guangzhou East railway station
 Guangzhou East Railway Station (metro), the adjoining Guangzhou Metro station
 Hangzhou East railway station
 Ningbo East railway station
 Shenzhen East railway station
 Zhengzhou East railway station

Poland
 Warszawa Wschodnia railway station (Warsaw East)

Portugal
 Gare do Oriente (Lisbon Oriente Station)

Sweden
 Stockholm East Station (Stockholms östra station)
 Umeå East Station (Umeå Östra)

Switzerland
 Aareschlucht Ost MIB railway station
 Biberist Ost railway station
 Interlaken Ost railway station
 La Chaux-de-Fonds-Est railway station
 Les Coeudres-Est railway station, La Sagne; see La Chaux-de-Fonds–Les Ponts-de-Martel railway
 Petit-Martel-Est railway station, Les Ponts-de-Martel; see La Chaux-de-Fonds–Les Ponts-de-Martel railway

United Kingdom
 Canterbury East railway station, London
 Hertford East railway station
 Maidstone East railway station
 Peterborough East railway station
 Runcorn East railway station
 Southend East railway station

See also 

West Station (disambiguation)
North Station (disambiguation)
South Station (disambiguation)